Sir Christopher Hatton Academy (formerly Sir Christopher Hatton School) is an 11–18 mixed, secondary school and sixth form with academy status in Wellingborough, Northamptonshire, England. It was established in 1983 and is part of the Hatton Academies Trust. It is named after Sir Christopher Hatton, a prominent Tudor politician and courtier of Queen Elizabeth I.

History 
Sir Christopher Hatton School was established in 1983 following the merger of Westfield Boys School and Breezehill Girls School, on the Breezehill site. It has been a grant-maintained school and then a foundation school. It converted to academy status in March 2012 and renamed Sir Christopher Hatton Academy. It was rated 'outstanding' by Ofsted following its inspection in January 2015.

House system 
The school has a house system of four houses which are named after people linked to Sir Christopher Hatton and his history, and are represented by a colour. The houses are:

 Burghley (after William Cecil, 1st Baron Burghley)
 Drake (after Francis Drake)
 Raleigh (after Walter Raleigh)
 Walsingham (after Francis Walsingham)

Notable alumni 
 Dan Bendon, cricketer
 Kylie Pentelow, journalist and television news presenter
 Tom Pursglove, politician

References

External links 
 

Secondary schools in North Northamptonshire
Academies in North Northamptonshire
Educational institutions established in 1983
1983 establishments in England